Fire and Sword or With Fire and Sword may refer to:
 With Fire and Sword, 1884 historical novel by Henryk Sienkiewicz 
 Fire and Sword (novel), 2009 historical novel by Simon Scarrow
 Fire and Sword, 1982 German film based on the Tristan and Isolde story 
 With Fire and Sword (film), 1999 Polish film based on the Sienkiewicz novel
 Mount & Blade: With Fire & Sword, 2011 video game loosely based on the Sienkiewicz novel

See also
 Fire and Steel (disambiguation)